The Ukraine Billie Jean King Cup team represents Ukraine in the Billie Jean King Cup tennis competition and are governed by the Ukrainian Tennis Federation. They currently compete in the 2020 Fed Cup Europe/Africa Zone Group I.

History 
Ukraine competed in its first Fed Cup in 1993.  Their best result is reaching the World Group in 2010 Fed Cup and 2012 Fed Cup.

Current team
Most recent year-end rankings are used.

Team matches

Player win–loss record

See also 
Fed Cup
Ukraine Davis Cup team

References

External links 

Billie Jean King Cup teams
Fed Cup
Fed Cup